Nabila Jamshed is a humanitarian, public speaker, and the author of the fantasy novel Wish Upon A Time - The Legendary Scimitar. She has delivered 9 TEDx talks, and currently works with the United Nations.

Bibliography

Footnotes

External links
 Blog profile
 Official Website

Indian women novelists
Living people
Writers of young adult literature
Delhi University alumni
21st-century Indian women writers
21st-century Indian novelists
Year of birth missing (living people)